The Mediterranean States is a geopolitical term referring to the countries of Cyprus and Malta. They are the only two island countries in the Mediterranean Sea. Northern Cyprus would be a third, but no nation besides Turkey recognises it as independent. The Mediterranean States are not to be confused with the Mediterranean-bordering countries of Southern Europe such as Italy, Greece and Turkey.

 

Mediterranean